DijahSB is a rapper based in Toronto, Ontario. They released their debut album 2020 the Album in 2020, followed by their second album Head Above the Waters in 2021.

Career 
Beginning rapping professionally in 2011, they previously released music under the name Kzaraw and was part of a rap group Class of 93, along with their producer Jermaine “Astro Mega” Clarke. They later rebranded as DijahSB, with the name inspired by the Nike SB line of shoes.

In 2016, they released the EP Manic Luxury independently. They released their debut album in the summer of 2020. After releasing their first album, DijahSB signed a distribution deal with AWAL, quit their retail job at the Apple Store, and became a full-time musician. Their second album was released in April 2021, entitled Head Above the Waters. In 2021, they were named one of 20 musicians in Now Magazine'''s "The sound of Toronto in 2021". They have also collaborated with other artists including Janette King and Brazilian rapper niLL.Head Above the Waters was shortlisted for the 2021 Polaris Music Prize. The single "Frontin' Like Pharrell" was a nominee for the 2021 SOCAN Songwriting Prize. The most recent single Green Line featuring Terrell Morris is released in January 2022.

 Personal life 
DijahSB identifies as non-binary.

 Discography 

 Studio albums 

 2020 the Album (2020)
 Head Above the Waters (2021)

 EPs 

 Blue (2015)
 Manic Luxury (2016)
 Girls Give Me Anxiety'' (2020)

References 

Living people
Black Canadian musicians
Non-binary musicians
Canadian LGBT musicians
LGBT rappers
21st-century Canadian rappers
Year of birth missing (living people)
Black Canadian LGBT people
21st-century Canadian LGBT people